Miracle on 1st Street is a 2007 South Korean comedy-drama film. Written and directed by Yoon Je-kyoon, it reunited him with actors Im Chang-jung and Ha Ji-won, the stars of his earlier film Sex Is Zero. With 2,750,457 admissions, Miracle on 1st Street was the 5th most popular Korean film of 2007.

Plot
Pil-je is a gangster who has been sent by his bosses to evict the residents of a poor neighborhood on the edge of Seoul, so that their homes can make way for some new luxury apartments. But after he befriends some of the locals, including female boxer Myung-ran and a group of young children, he starts to have a change of heart.

Release
It was a huge hit with 2.75 million viewers nationwide, and in the movie, the redevelopment area is shown as the first site of Cheongsong Village, which was actually filmed in the water valley of Busan. Since then, the village has become famous in its own way, with murals being painted. There are some people who are confused with the gift of Room 7.

Cast
 Im Chang-jung as Pil-je
 Ha Ji-won as Myung-ran
 Joo Hyun as Director Lee
 Jung Doo-hong as Myung-ran's father 
 Lee Hoon as Tae-suk
 Kang Ye-won as Seon-joo
 Park Chang-ik as Il-dong
 Park Yoo-seon as Yi-soon
 Ko Tae-ho as Deok-goo
 Kim Hee-won as Director Kim

References

External links
  
 
 
 
 

2007 films
2000s sports comedy-drama films
2000s Korean-language films
South Korean boxing films
South Korean gangster films
South Korean sports comedy-drama films
Films directed by Yoon Je-kyoon
2000s South Korean films